West Virginia Route 112 is an east–west state highway in southern West Virginia. The western terminus is at U.S. Route 19 east of Bluefield, in the shadow of a "bridge to nowhere" on the future King Coal Highway. The eastern terminus is at U.S. Route 460 in Oakvale.

WV 112 was formerly a portion of WV 12.

Major intersections

References

112
Transportation in Mercer County, West Virginia